Palić is a town located in the city of Subotica, North Bačka District, autonomous province of Vojvodina, Serbia. The town has a Hungarian ethnic majority and its population numbering 7,771 inhabitants (as of 2011 census). Many tourists come to Palić every year because of the Palić lake and spa. There are over 450 guest houses, and even a five-star hotel.

It is known for its Palić European Film Festival which takes place every summer. In 2008 the life achievement award was presented to the British film director Ken Loach.

Demographics

Historical population
1961: 6,135
1971: 7,253
1981: 6,974
1991: 7,375
2002: 7,745
2011: 7,771

Ethnic groups
Hungarians = 4,178 (53.95%)
Serbs = 1,930 (24.92%)
Croats = 399 (5.15%)
Yugoslavs = 351 (4.53%)
Bunjevci = 335 (4.33%)

Cityscape
Unique in Serbia, Palić and adjacent Subotica have the most buildings built in the Hungarian Secession style, a distinct variant of Art Nouveau. The Hungarian Secession style was operational between the 1890s and World War I. Its designs combined art nouveau vegetal ornaments and symbolic figures with traditional Hungarian motifs. It found its architectural expression in Palić in the works of Marcell Komor, Dezső Jakab.

Palić lake 

In 1995 the Tisa-Palić canal was opened so that the lake would remain as healthy as it was before in spite of development around the lake.

Twin towns – sister cities
 Újszász, Hungary

Climate 
Palić has a  humid subtropical climate (Köppen climate classification: Cfa) with hot summers and cold winters. With 2,190 hours of sunshine annually it is amongst Serbia's sunniest cities.

See also
Palić lake
Subotica
List of places in Serbia
List of cities, towns and villages in Vojvodina

Notes

External links 

www.palic.rs Official tourism site of Palić Resort
Palić Virtual Tour

- Official web site
Map of Palić Resort

 
Places in Bačka
Populated places in North Bačka District
Subotica
Hungarian communities in Serbia
Towns in Serbia